The 2020 season is Young Lion's 17th consecutive season in the top flight of Singapore football and in the S.League.

Squad

S.League squad

U19 Squad
(Singapore Sport School)

Coaching staff

Transfer

Pre-season transfer

In

Out

Retained

Trial

Mid-season transfers

In

Out

Friendly

Pre-Season Friendly

Team statistics

Appearances and goals 

Numbers in parentheses denote appearances as substitute.

Competitions

Overview

Singapore Premier League

See also 
 2017 Garena Young Lions FC season
 2018 Young Lions FC season
 2019 Young Lions FC season

Notes

References 

Young Lions FC
Young Lions FC seasons